Gregory Maass (born 29 April 1967 in Hagen, Germany) and Nayoungim (sometimes referred to as Kim Nayoung; ; born 13 March 1966 in Seoul, South Korea) are two artists who work together as a collaborative duo called Gregory Maass & Nayoungim.  Gregory Maass & Nayoungim's idiosyncratic work brings together philosophy, psychoanalysis, cybernetics, cybernetic management, economy, fringe science, science fiction, art and craft, music, comics, conspiracy theory, sub-culture, and food  by focusing on such diverse means as adaptation,  normality, perversion, and methodology. They are the founders of Kim Kim Gallery, which describes itself as "a non-profit organization, locative art, an art dealership based on unconventional marketing, a curatorial approach, an exhibition design firm, and editor of rare art books, depending on the situation it adapts to; in short, it does not fit the format imposed by the term Gallery." One rarely appears in public without the other.

Early lives
Gregory Maass was born in Hagen in North Rhine-Westphalia, northern Germany, his mother tongue being German.  He worked as a paramedic before moving to Paris, France. He studied philosophy at the Paris-Sorbonne University and art at the École nationale supérieure des Beaux-Arts, at the Institut des Hautes Études en Arts Plastiques (IHEAP) Paris (1993–94) and at Jan Van Eyck Academie the Netherlands  (1998–2000).

Nayoungim was born in Seoul in South Korea. She studied art at the Seoul National University and later at the École nationale supérieure des Beaux-Arts. The two first met on 12 September 1991 while studying sculpture at the ENSBA. The two claim they came together because they are both egomaniacs who form a symbiosis. They communicate with each other in French and English. They have claimed that they married in 2008.

Works
Their work has addressed a wide variety of subject matters including scatology, survivalism, and economy. The two artists rarely appear in their own work.

Toilet Paper Still Lifes
are often life-size photographic representations on canvas of toilet paper rolls arranged on a table top. Depending on the composition the images are called “Arsewipe rocket”, "torche-cul", or “Ass-ana”.

Relationships Do Not Exist
The pair is perhaps best known for their miniature work called "Relationships Do Not Exist". This group of sculptures is one of the largest series of work created by Gregory Maass & Nayoungim. Relationships Do Not Exist is among the more iconic, philosophically astute and visually humorous works that Gregory Maass & Nayoungim have created. The title derives from the famous Jacques Lacan quote “Sexual relationships do not exist”. 
They proceeded by choosing samples from a wide collection of figurines ranging from the 1950s until today. In an intricate process the bodies are dismembered and reassembled, painted and mounted on empty trophy pedestals. Gregory Maass & Nayoungim call this an adaptation method: "First we cannibalize them and then they get frankensteined back together."

A Snowman for Busan
is a public art work installed in Busan, a town where it hardly ever snows. It is a chromed steel snowman placed on a rooftop water tower of a local kindergarten.

Mona Lisa Overdrive
is a public art work, first installed in front of the Seoul railway station in 2008. It is made of rubber, toys, foam mattresses and steel frames, and sprayed over with expansion foam. The entire construction is painted with a collection of surplus paints. The face of the sculpture depicts the past, present, and future of the city of Seoul.

Interviews
 Video interview with Gregory Maass & Nayoungim in their show "The Early Worm",
 "Octavianus", a video interview with Gregory Maass and Yiso Bahc.
 "Pièce Unique", an Interview with Gregory Maass about the art of Robert Estermann.

Shows

Tears Of Boredom

Gregory Maass´ first solo-show entitled "Tears of Boredom" (the original German title is "Tränen vor Langeweile"), was held in 1991 in Hagen, Germany. It consisted of a tautological representation of peanuts. Large scale peanut butter paintings representing peanuts, black and white photographs of peanuts, and an installation of peanuts positioned in tensegrity were on display.

The Early Worm Catches The Bird
duo-show was about different kinds of possible success in art, be it fame and glory, money and power, or the desired result of an attempt. The title derives from  Genesis P-Orridge´s first recording with Worm. "In the summer of 1968, Worm recorded their first and only album, entitled Early Worm, in Megson's parents attic in Solihull. It was pressed onto vinyl in November at Deroy Sound Services in Manchester, but only one copy was ever produced. A second album, Catching the Bird, was recorded but never pressed."

The Handsome Tofu
"Tofu incorporates the meaning of mildness, nutritiousness, purity, shaped shapelessness, tasteful tastelessness, crème de la crème, exclusiveness, peacefulness and so on, which were the inspiration to build this show." It took place at the Department for Philosophy and Art in Assen, Netherlands.

Survival of the Shitest
was a show realized with the help of mentally ill patients in the 3bisF Contemporary Art Space in Aix-en-Provence, France, which is located inside the walls of a psychiatric ward. It included works such as "This is punk" and "Hunter S. Thompson´s mirror shades".

Awards and Scholarships

Institut des Hautes Études en Arts Plastiques Paris (1993–94)
Jan Van Eyck Academie the Netherlands.  (1998–2000)
Atelier Rondo, Kultur Service Gesellschaft Steiermark, Graz, Austria (2008)
United Sardine Factory Studio Grant, Bergen, Norway (2007)
NKD, Studio Grant, Dale, Norway (2006)
Lademoen Kunstnerverksteder Studio Grant, Trondheim, Norway (2006)
Cite Internationale des Arts, AFAA Studio Grant, Paris, France, (2004)
Boswil Artists’ House Foundation Studio Grant, Boswil, Switzerland
Korean Film Commission Grant, Seoul, Korea, 2002
Samsung Unni Atelier, Samsung Culture & Arts Foundation Studio Grant, Seoul, Korea (2001)
Parc St.-Leger Centre d'Art Contemporain Studio Grant, Pougues-les-eaux, France (2000)
Joseph Ebstein Price For Sculpture, Paris, France (1997)

Influences
Gregory Maass claims to be influenced in his thinking by Robert Filliou´s "Principle Of Equivalence", which states that (Well done, Badly done, Not done) are three equivalent assumptions, and the writings of Philip K. Dick.

References

Further reading
Unfucking Real, Works 2009-2012, published in 2013 by Caustic Window 
Face Zine
Eloquence, international Creators Magazine, March 2013
Dazed & Confused Korea, Interview
Art in Culture Best Exhibition 2013

External links

Kim Kim Gallery
Blog on Gregory Maass and Nayoungim
Blog on Kim Kim Gallery

Art duos
Conceptual artists
Postmodern artists